The Battle of Mycale (Machē tēs Mykalēs) was one of the two major battles (the other being the Battle of Plataea) that ended the second Persian invasion of Greece during the Greco-Persian Wars. It took place on or about August 27, 479 BC on the slopes of Mount Mycale, on the coast of Ionia, opposite the island of Samos. The battle was fought between an alliance of the Greek city-states, including Sparta, Athens and Corinth, and the Persian Empire of Xerxes I.

The previous year, the Persian invasion force, led by Xerxes himself, had scored victories at the battles of Thermopylae and Artemisium, and conquered Thessaly, Boeotia and Attica; however, at the ensuing Battle of Salamis, the allied Greek navies had won an unlikely victory, and therefore prevented the conquest of the Peloponnese. Xerxes then retreated, leaving his general Mardonius with a substantial army to finish off the Greeks the following year.

In the summer of 479 BC, the Greeks assembled a huge army (by contemporary standards), and marched to confront Mardonius at the Battle of Plataea. At the same time, the allied fleet sailed to Samos, where the demoralised remnants of the Persian navy were based. The Persians, seeking to avoid a battle, beached their fleet below the slopes of Mycale, and, with the support of a Persian army group, built a palisaded camp. The Greek commander Leotychides decided to attack the Persians anyway, landing the fleet's complement of marines to do so.

Although the Persian forces put up stout resistance, the heavily armoured Greek hoplites again proved themselves superior in combat, and eventually routed the Persian troops, who fled to their camp. The Ionian Greek contingents in the Persian army defected, and the camp was assailed and a large number of Persians slaughtered. The Persian ships were then captured and burned. The complete destruction of the Persian navy, along with the destruction of Mardonius's army at Plataea (allegedly on the same day as the Battle of Mycale), decisively ended the invasion of Greece. After Plataea and Mycale, the allied Greeks would take the offensive against the Persians, marking a new phase of the Greco-Persian Wars. Although Mycale was in every sense a decisive victory, it does not seem to have been attributed the same significance (even at the time) as, for example the Athenian victory at the Battle of Marathon or even the Greek defeat at Thermopylae.

Background 

The Greek city-states of Athens and Eretria had supported the unsuccessful Ionian Revolt against the Persian Empire of Darius I in 499-494 BC. The Persian Empire was still relatively young, and prone to revolts amongst its subject peoples. Moreover, Darius had spent considerable time extinguishing revolts against his rule. The Ionian revolt threatened the integrity of his empire, and Darius thus vowed to punish those involved (especially those not already part of the empire). Darius also saw the opportunity to expand his empire into the fractious world of Ancient Greece. A preliminary expedition under Mardonius, in 492 BC, to secure the land approaches to Greece ended with the re-conquest of Thrace and forced Macedon to become a client kingdom of Persia. An amphibious task force was then sent out under Datis and Artaphernes in 490 BC, successfully sacking Naxos and Eretria, before moving to attack Athens. However, at the ensuing Battle of Marathon, the Athenians won a remarkable victory, which resulted in the withdrawal of the Persian army to Asia.

Darius therefore began raising a huge new army with which he meant to completely subjugate Greece. However, he died before the invasion could begin. The throne of Persia passed to his son Xerxes I, who quickly resumed the preparations for the invasion of Greece, including building two pontoon bridges across the Hellespont. In 481 BC, Xerxes sent ambassadors around Greece asking for earth and water as a gesture of their submission, but making the very deliberate omission of Athens and Sparta (both of whom were at open war with Persia). Support thus began to coalesce around these two leading states. A congress of city states met at Corinth in late autumn of 481 BC, and a confederate alliance of Greek city-states was formed (hereafter referred to as 'the Allies'). This was remarkable for the disjointed Greek world, especially since many of the city-states in attendance were still technically at war with each other.

The Allies initially adopted a strategy of blocking the land and sea approaches to southern Greece. Thus, in August 480 BC, after hearing of Xerxes's approach, a small Allied army led by the Spartan king Leonidas I blocked the Pass of Thermopylae, whilst an Athenian-dominated navy sailed to the Straits of Artemisium. Famously, the vastly outnumbered Greek army held Thermopylae against the Persians army for six days in total, before being outflanked by a mountain path. Although much of the Greek army retreated, the rearguard, formed of the Spartan and Thespian contingents, was surrounded and annihilated. The simultaneous Battle of Artemisium, consisting of a series of naval encounters, was up to that point a stalemate; however, when news of Thermopylae reached them, they also retreated, since holding the straits of Artemisium was now a moot point.

Following Thermopylae, the Persian army had proceeded to burn and sack the Boeotian cities which had not surrendered, Plataea and Thespiae, before taking possession of the now-evacuated city of Athens. The allied army, meanwhile, prepared to defend the Isthmus of Corinth. Xerxes wished for a final crushing defeat of the Allies to finish the conquest of Greece in that campaigning season; conversely the allies sought a decisive victory over the Persian navy that would guarantee the security of the Peloponnese. The ensuing naval Battle of Salamis ended in a decisive victory for the Allies, marking a turning point in the conflict.

Following the defeat of his navy at the Salamis, Xerxes retreated to Asia with, according to Herodotus at least, the majority of the army. Herodotus suggests that this was because he feared the Greeks would sail to the Hellespont and destroy the pontoon bridges, thereby trapping his army in Europe. He thus left Mardonius, with handpicked troops, to complete the conquest of Greece the following year. Mardonius evacuated Attica, and wintered in Thessaly; the Athenians then reoccupied their destroyed city. Over the winter, there seems to have been some tension among the Allies. In particular, the Athenians, who were not protected by the Isthmus, but whose fleet were the key to the security of the Peloponnese, felt hard done by, and demanded an allied army march north the following year. When the Allies failed to commit to this, the Athenian fleet refused to join the Allied navy in spring. The navy, now under the command of the Spartan king Leotychides, thus skulked off Delos, whilst the remnants of the Persian fleet skulked off Samos, both sides unwilling to risk battle. Similarly, Mardonius remained in Thessaly, knowing an attack on the Isthmus was pointless, whilst the Allies refused to send an army outside the Peloponnese.

Mardonius moved to break the stalemate by trying to win over the Athenians and their fleet through the mediation of Alexander I of Macedon, offering peace, self-government and territorial expansion. The Athenians made sure that a Spartan delegation was also on hand to hear the offer, and rejected it:  The degree to which we are put in the shadow by the Medes' strength is hardly something you need to bring to our attention. We are already well aware of it. But even so, such is our love of liberty, that we will never surrender. Upon this refusal, the Persians marched south again. Athens was again evacuated and left to the Persians. Mardonius now repeated his offer of peace to the Athenian refugees on Salamis. Athens, along with Megara and Plataea, sent emissaries to Sparta demanding assistance, and threatening to accept the Persian terms if not.  According to Herodotus, the Spartans, who were at that time celebrating the festival of Hyacinthus, delayed making a decision until they were persuaded by a guest, Chileos of Tegea, who pointed out the danger to all of Greece if the Athenians surrendered. When the Athenian emissaries delivered an ultimatum to the Spartans the next day, they were amazed to hear that a task force was in fact already en route; the Spartan army was marching to meet the Persians. The Greek city-state alliance, which included the Spartan and Athenian armies, then proceeded northward toward the Persian army led by Mardonius, with the two forces ultimately facing each other in the Battle of Plataea.

Meanwhile, the Athenian navy under Xanthippus joined with the Allied fleet off Delos. They were then approached by a delegation from Samos, who suggested that the Ionian cities would revolt if the Allied fleet successfully engaged the Persian fleet. They furthermore pointed out the poor morale and reduced seaworthiness of the Persian fleet. Leotychides decided to attempt this, and sailed for Samos.

Prelude 

When the Persians heard that the Allied fleet was approaching, they set sail from Samos towards the Ionian mainland. According to Herodotus, this was because they had decided in council that they could not beat the Allies in a naval battle. They sent the Phoenician ships away (Herodotus does not explain why), and then sailed to the shore near Mount Mycale. Xerxes had left an army there, under the command of Tigranes, to guard Ionia. The Persians beached their ships, built a palisade around them, and prepared to guard the makeshift fort.

Finding the Persian fleet gone from Samos, the Allies were thrown into uncertainty. Eventually they resolved that they would sail to the mainland, and equipped themselves for a naval battle. However, when the Allies approached Mycale, the Persians did not attempt to engage them, and remained guarding their camp. Leotychides therefore sailed as close to the camp as possible, and had a herald make an appeal to the Ionians: "Men of Ionia, you who hear us, understand what I say, for by no means will the Persians understand anything I charge you with when we join battle; first of all it is right for each man to remember his freedom and next the battle-cry Hebe: and let him who hears me tell him who has not heard it."  Herodotus suggests that the purpose of this message was twofold; firstly to encourage the Ionians, unbeknownst to the Persians, to fight for the Allies (or at least not to fight against them); or, if the message became known to the Persians, to make the Persians mistrust the Ionians.

Following this appeal, the Allies also beached their ships, and began to prepare to assault the camp. The Persians, guessing that their Samian contingent would support the allies, took away their armour.  Furthermore, they sent the Milesians to guard the passes over Mycale, suspecting that the Milesians might also defect.  Thus rid of two potential internal threats, the Persians left their camp, and prepared for battle. It is probable that the relatively small number of marines that the Allies had disembarked for the battle made them overconfident, encouraging the Persians to leave the safety of their camp.

Herodotus reports that as the Allies approached the Persian camp, rumour spread amongst them of an Allied victory at Plataea; Diodorus also claims that Leotychides informed the Allies of victory at Plataea before the battle began. Their morale boosted by this omen, they set forth to win their own victory. Various explanations have been attempted to explain this occurrence, and also the alleged fact that Plataea and Mycale took place on the same day. Green suggests that following the victory at Plataea, the Allied commander Pausanias took control of the Persian beacon system that Xerxes had used to communicate with Asia, and used it to send tidings of Plataea to the Allied fleet. This would explain the rumour of victory and near simultaneous attack, but is only one possible theory.

Opposing Forces

The Persians 

The number of Persian ships and men involved with the battle is, as so often in the Greco-Persian Wars, somewhat problematic. It is clear that the Persian fleet did not dare conduct operations against the Greeks, and thus must have been approximately equal to, or smaller than the Greek fleet. Herodotus gives the size of the Persian fleet at 300 ships; the Greeks had 378 at Salamis, but must have suffered significant losses, and so they probably also had around 300 in total (though not necessarily all these ships formed part of the allied fleet for 479 BC). The Phoenician ships were dismissed from the Persian fleet before the battle, which reduced its strength further.

Diodorus tells us that to guard the camp and the ships the Persians gathered 100,000 men in total,
while Herodotus suggests that there were 60,000 men in the army under the command of Tigranes. Squaring these two accounts, might suggest that there were c. 40,000 men with the fleet. Given that the Persian fleet appears to have been undermanned in the aftermath of Salamis, 200-300 ships would indeed give this number of naval personnel (using Herodotus's standard complement of 200 men per ship). However, this total of 100,000 is probably too high; to accommodate 100,000 men and 200+ ships, the Persian camp would have to have been enormous. Estimates made of Mardonius's huge camp at Plataea, which was planned and built with plenty of time, suggest it might have accommodated 70,000-120,000 men; it is improbable that such a large camp could have been built at Mycale in the time-frame that Herodotus suggests. It is therefore possible that the 60,000 quoted by Herodotus is actually the total number of Persians present at Mycale; the Persians certainly outnumbered the Allies, emerging from the palisade in confidence after seeing the smaller number of the Allied troops.

The Persian force of 60,000 most likely consisted of spearmen and archers from the various contingents of Persians, Medes, and Red Sea Islanders, though a small force of Persian cavalry was also recruited into the army. In addition to the Persians, Medes, and Red Sea Islanders, there were also some contingents of Greek mercenaries in the Persian army at Mycale, but Herodotus wrote that these later defected over to the Greeks during the main battle outside the Persian camp of Mount Mycale.

The Greeks 
Numbers of ships and men for the Allies are also somewhat problematic. Herodotus claims that Leotychides had 110 triremes under his command. However, the previous year, the allies had fielded 271 triremes at the Battle of Artemisium, and then 378 at the Battle of Salamis. We are also told that the Allies had "command of the sea" after Salamis, which implies that they could at least equal the Persian fleet. Diodorus, on the other hand, tells us the allies had 250 ships, which is more consistent with their force levels of the previous year. These two numbers can be reconciled by assuming that Leotychides had 110 triremes under his command before being joined by Xanthippus and the Athenian ships, after the Allied army had marched out from the Peloponnesus. This is the approach taken by Holland, and gives a naval force which might well match the remnants of the Persian fleet.

Although the Athenians had sent 8,000 hoplites to Plataea, they would still have had ample manpower to man a large fleet of triremes, especially since rowers tended to be of the lower classes (the thetes) who could not afford the equipment to fight as hoplites. The standard complement of a trireme was 200 men, including 14 marines. In the second Persian invasion of Greece, each Persian ship had carried thirty extra marines, and this was probably also true in the first invasion when the whole invasion force was apparently carried in triremes. Furthermore, the Chian ships at the Battle of Lade also carried 40 marines each. This suggests that a trireme could probably carry a maximum of 40–45 soldiers—triremes seem to have been easily destabilised by extra weight. Combining these numbers  yields a range of 22,000–58,000 men for the Allies, with 3,300–11,250 more heavily armoured marines. Estimates of around 40,000 men are given in some sources, which is approximately the median of the possible range, and seems as likely a number as any. However, since only the marines were expected to fight hand to hand, the rowers in the Allied fleet were probably not equipped to fight in a land battle; it is likely therefore that it was only the marines who contested the battle.

Strategic & tactical considerations 
From a strategic point of view, battle was not necessary for either side; the main strategic theatre was mainland Greece itself. Although destroying the enemy navy would result in a clear strategic advantage for both sides, attempting this risked the loss of their own navy. The actions of the two sides thus reflect more upon their morale and confidence than on any strategic considerations. The Persians, seeing little to gain in battle, demoralised and riven with dissent, thus sought to avoid a naval battle. Conversely, the Allies, who had initially been as nervous of a battle as the Persians, sought to press home their morale advantage once they were informed of the state of the Persian fleet.

Tactically, the Persian fleet should have held the advantage at sea, since the Athenian part of the Greek fleet was, despite their efforts at Artemisium and Salamis, still raw in seamanship. However, whether because of their low morale, or because they were in fact outnumbered, the Persians sought instead the tactical advantage of joining up with the army under Tigranes, and fortifying a position. However, when the Greeks chose to fight on land, the Persians then threw away the advantage of their fortifications by emerging to fight the Greeks in the open field. Furthermore, as Marathon and Thermopylae had shown, large numbers conferred little advantage against the more heavily armoured hoplites; thus, as the battle began, it was the Greeks who had the tactical upper hand.

The battle 

The Allies seem to have formed into two wings; on the right were the Athenians, Corinthians, Sicyonians and Troezenians, and on the left were the Spartans with other contingents. The right wing marched across level ground straight towards the Persian camp, whilst the left wing attempted to outflank the Persians by passing through more broken ground. The right wing thus began fighting with the Persians while the left wing was still approaching. Herodotus reports that the Persians fought well at first, but that the Athenians and the contingents with them wished to win the victory before the Spartans arrived, and thus attacked ever more zealously.

Although the Persians stood their ground for a while, they eventually broke and fled to the palisade. The soldiers of the right wing followed them into the camp, at which point many of the Persian army fled from the camp, except the ethnic Persian troops, who grouped together and fought the Allied soldiers who entered the camp. Finally, the left wing arrived, outflanking the camp and falling on the rear of the remaining Persian forces, thereby completing the rout.

Herodotus tells us that, on seeing the outcome of the battle hung in the balance, the disarmed Samians had joined in on the side of the allies, doing what they could. This inspired the other Ionian contingents to turn on the Persians as well. At which stage in the battle this happened is not clear; the Samians were presumably not in the main battle line (being disarmed), so it may have been after the Persians retreated to the camp. Meanwhile, the Milesians who were guarding the passes of Mycale also turned on the Persians. At first they misdirected the fleeing Persian contingents so that they ended up back amongst the Allied troops; then, perhaps seeing the outcome of the battle was certain, they began killing the fleeing Persians.

Herodotus does not mention specific figures for casualties, merely saying that losses were heavy on both sides. The Sicyonians in particular suffered, also losing their general Perilaus. On the Persian side, the admiral Mardontes and the general Tigranes were both killed, though Artayntes escaped. Herodotus says that a few Persian troops escaped the battle and made their way to Sardis. Diodorus claims that there were 40,000 Persian casualties, and also suggests that the survivors made their way to Sardis.

Aftermath 

When the Spartans arrived, the Persian camp was looted and their beached ships destroyed. Returning to Samos they then discussed their next moves. Leotychides proposed that they evacuate the cities of the Ionian Greeks and bring the population to the Greek mainland, since it would be difficult to defend Ionia against further Persian attacks. Xanthippus however vehemently objected to this, since the Ionian cities were originally Greek colonies. The Ionian Greeks later joined the Athenians in the "Delian League" against Persia.

With the twin victories of Plataea and Mycale, the second Persian invasion of Greece was over. Moreover, the threat of a future invasion was abated; although the Greeks remained worried that Xerxes would try again, over time it became apparent that the Persian desire to conquer Greece was much diminished.

After the victory at Mycale, the Allied fleet sailed to the Hellespont to break down the pontoon bridges, but found that this was already done. The Peloponnesians sailed home, but the Athenians remained to attack the Chersonesos, still held by the Persians. The Persians in the region, and their allies, made for Sestos, the strongest town in the region, and the Athenians laid siege to them there. After a protracted siege, Sestos fell to the Athenians, marking the beginning of a new phase in the Greco-Persian Wars, the Greek counterattack. Herodotus ended his Histories after the siege of Sestos. Over the next 30 years, the Greeks, primarily the Athenian-dominated Delian League, would expel (or help expel) the Persians from Macedon, Thrace, the Aegean islands and Ionia. Peace with Persia finally came in 449 BC with the Peace of Callias, finally ending the half-century of warfare.

Significance 

Mycale and Plataea have great significance in ancient history as the battles which decisively ended the second Persian invasion of Greece, thereby swinging the balance of the Greco-Persian Wars in favour of the Greeks. The Battle of Salamis saved Greece from immediate conquest, but it was Mycale and Plataea which effectively ended that threat. However, neither of these battles is as well known as Thermopylae, Salamis or Marathon. The reason for this discrepancy is not entirely clear; it might however be a result of the circumstances in which the battle was fought. The fame of Thermopylae certainly lies in the doomed heroism of the Greeks in the face of overwhelming numbers; Marathon and Salamis perhaps because they were both fought against the odds, and in dire strategic situations. Conversely, the Battles of Plataea and Mycale were both fought from a relative position of Greek strength, and against lesser odds; perhaps the Greeks were even expecting to win and had certainly seen the opportunity to deal the final blow.

Militarily, the major lesson of both Mycale and Plataea (since both were fought on land) was the repeated confirmation of the superiority of the hoplite over the more lightly armed Persian infantry, as had first been demonstrated at Marathon. Taking on this lesson, after the Greco-Persian Wars the Persian empire started recruiting and relying on Greek mercenaries.

Sources 

The main source for the Greco-Persian Wars is the Greek historian Herodotus. He gives an account of the battle of Mycale in Book Nine of his Histories.

The Sicilian historian Diodorus Siculus, writing in the 1st century BC in his Bibliotheca Historica, also provides an account of the Battle of Mykale, derived directly from the earlier Greek historian Ephorus. This account is fairly consistent with Herodotus's. Archaeological evidence, such as the Serpent Column, also supports some of Herodotus's specific claims.

See also 
 Battle of Plataea
 Battle of Salamis
 Delian League
 Greco-Persian Wars
 Leotychides
 Second Persian invasion of Greece
 Xanthippus

References

Bibliography

Ancient sources 
 Herodotus, The Histories Perseus online version
 Ctesias, Persica (excerpt in Photius's epitome)
 Diodorus Siculus, Biblioteca Historica
 Plutarch, Aristides
 Xenophon, Anabasis

Modern sources 
 Holland, Tom. Persian Fire. Abacus, 2005
 Green, Peter. The Greco-Persian Wars. Berkeley: University of California Press, 1970; revised ed., 1996 (hardcover); 1998 (paperback)
 Lazenby, JF. The Defence of Greece 490–479 BC. Aris & Phillips Ltd., 1993
 Fehling, D. Herodotus and His "Sources": Citation, Invention, and Narrative Art. Translated by J.G. Howie. Arca Classical and Medieval Texts, Papers, and Monographs, 21. Leeds: Francis Cairns, 1989
 Connolly, P. Greece and Rome at War, 1981

External links 
 Livius Picture Archive: Mycale (Dilek Dagi)

Mycale
Mycale
479 BC
Mycale